Nina Bratchikova and Ekaterina Ivanova were the defending champions but both decided not to participate. 
Vitalia Diatchenko and Galina Voskoboeva won the tournament by defeating Akgul Amanmuradova and Alexandra Panova in the final 6–3, 6–4.

Seeds

  Vitalia Diatchenko /  Galina Voskoboeva (champions)
  Akgul Amanmuradova /  Alexandra Panova (final)
  Vesna Dolonts /  Evgeniya Rodina (semifinals)
  Çağla Büyükakçay /  Veronika Kapshay (quarterfinals)

Draw

Draw

References
 Main Draw

President's Cup (tennis) - Doubles
2011 Women's Doubles